Hey-Hey-Hey Live Roskilde Festival 83 is a live album by the Danish rock band Warm Guns, released in 1983.

Until 1983, the Roskilde Festival had rejected Warm Guns on the grounds that they didn't book Danish bands singing in English. However, the band finally got to play the festival's Rhythm Tent – a show recorded by the Danish National Radio. The band's Roskilde Festival debut was so successful, that the recording was  used for the live album released in the fall of 1983.

Track listing

Side 1 
 "Rip Off" (Muhl/Hauschildt) – 3:53
 "Nightcrawlers" (Muhl/Hauschildt) – 3:01
 "Bedtime Story" (Muhl) – 2:50
 "Every Teardrop Means A Lot" (Muhl) – 2:41 
 "Wonderkids" (Muhl/Muhl-Hauschildt) – 4:17
 "I'll Get You" (Muhl/Muhl-Hauschildt) – 2:47

Side 2 
 "Can't Give Or Take Anymore" (Muhl) – 3:26
 "Wild Life" (Muhl) – 2:35
 "Let's Go" (Muhl) – 3:16
 "Someone Who Cares" (Muhl) – 3:52
 "Under My Skin" (Muhl) – 3:22

Personnel 
 Lars Muhl – vocals
 Lars Hybel – guitar
 Jacob Perbøll – guitar
 Lars Kiehn – keyboards
 Kaj Weber – bass, backing vocals
 Troels Møller – drums, backing vocals

Production 
 Robert Borges – producer
 Johnny – engineer
 Lars Poulsen – live mix
 Henrik Hambroe – lighting
 Johan Petersen – stage
 Kristian Mikael de Freitas Olesen – coverphoto
 Kristian Mikael de Freitas Olesen, Gorm Valentin & Muhl – additional photos
 Valle & Kiehn – cover design

Notes

References 
 Gaffa (1983): Ud Til Stregen. Gaffa no. 1, September 1983

External links
 Hey-Hey-Hey Live Roskilde Festival 83 on Calles Rock Shop  

Vertigo Records albums
1983 live albums
Warm Guns albums